Xiaogang Ma (born 1980) or Marshall Ma is a Chinese data science and geoinformatics researcher at the University of Idaho (UI), United States. He is an associate professor in the department of computer science at UI, and also affiliates with the department of earth and spatial sciences and several research institutes and centers at the university.

Early life and education
Ma was born in Tianmen, an inland county in Central China. He finished college and graduate studies at China University of Geosciences (Wuhan) in the early 2000s. Then in 2007 he went to ITC, the Netherlands for PhD study, originally affiliating with Utrecht University and then University of Twente. In 2011, he was awarded a PhD degree of Earth System Science and GIScience from University of Twente with his dissertation "Ontology Spectrum for Geological Data Interoperability". In early 2012, Ma joined the Tetherless World Constellation at Rensselaer Polytechnic Institute (RPI) as a postdoctorate fellow, with financial supports from the Sloan Foundation and NSF. At RPI, he received intensive training of data science methods and semantic technologies, and he participated and led several research projects. In 2014, Ma was promoted to associate research scientist at RPI.

Career
Ma's research addresses the needs of methods and building blocks in the cyberinfrastructure ecosystem to facilitate data science. At RPI, he took leadership roles for ontology development in the Global Change Information System of the U.S. Global Change Research Program and data science activities of the Sloan-funded Deep Carbon Observatory. He also taught a data analytics course for the Department of Earth and Environmental Sciences at RPI.

In 2016, Ma joined the Department of Computer Science at University of Idaho (UI). He continued his research on data science and geoinformatics at UI, including knowledge graphs, open data, and algorithms for spatio-temporal analysis, and he created several new courses related to data science and open data. In 2016 and 2017 Ma was an affiliate scientist with MILES - Managing Idaho's Landscapes for Ecosystem Services project, where he contributed to the cyberinfrastructure development. In 2018, he co-initiated the U.S. Semantic Technologies Symposium (US2TS) and received sponsorship from NSF, the Sloan Foundation, and Elsevier's Artificial Intelligence journal. Since 2017, Ma has worked intensively on the deep-time data science, with several projects funded by NSF and NASA. He has also been active in community programs or initiatives, including the Deep-Time Data Infrastructure, the Deep-time Data Driven Discoveries, and the IUGS Deep-time Digital Earth. In 2020 and 2021, Ma led a team of researchers from four U.S. universities and received a multi-million grant from NSF to conduct cross-disciplinary data science studies on climate change, ecology, biology, socioeconomics, and public health.

Ma is associate editor or editorial board member for several journals, including Computers & Geosciences, Applied Computing & Geosciences, Data Science Journal, Earth Science Informatics, and Big Earth Data. He has been the Chair of the Awards Committee of the International Association for Mathematical Geosciences (IAMG) since 2019. Previously, he served as Councilor of IAMG, Chair of the Geoinformatics and Data Science Division of the Geological Society of America, Chair of the Task Group for Coordinating Data Standards amongst Scientific Unions under CODATA, and Member of the Independent Review Board for NASA's Planetary Data Ecosystem. Ma is also active in several other data science and geoinformatics communities, including the American Geophysical Union, the Research Data Alliance, and the Federation of Earth Science Information Partners.

Representative publications 
2023: "Recent Advancement in Geoinformatics and Data Science", GSA Special Paper Book V. 558, ISBN 9780813725581
2022: "Data sharing: more science unions must act", Nature, 610(7931), 257 preprint | supplementary material
2022: "Knowledge graph construction and application in geosciences: A review", Computers & Geosciences, 161, 105082
2022: "Encyclopedia of Mathematical Geosciences" (section editor - geoinformatics), Springer, Cham
2018: "Data Science for Geoscience: Leveraging Mathematical Geosciences with Semantics and Open Data", Handbook of Mathematical Geosciences: Fifty Years of IAMG, Springer, Berlin
2018: "Information extraction and knowledge graph construction from geoscience literature", Computers & Geosciences, 112, 112-120
2015: "Semantic eScience" (lead editor), Springer, Berlin. Special Issue of Earth Science Informatics, ISSN 1865-0473
2014: "Capturing provenance of global change information", Nature Climate Change, 4(6), 409-413

Awards
2021 Outstanding Early-Career Faculty, University of Idaho College of Engineering
2018 SciTS Meritorious Contribution Award, Science of Team Science Conference
2015 Andrei B. Vistelius Research Award, International Association for Mathematical Geosciences
2014 Data Stewardship Award, International Council for Science World Data System
2012 Funding Friday Research Grant, Federation of Earth Science Information Partners

References

1980 births
University of Twente alumni
China University of Geosciences alumni
Chinese computer scientists
Living people
People from Tianmen
Chinese expatriates in the Netherlands
Rensselaer Polytechnic Institute faculty
University of Idaho faculty
Chinese expatriates in the United States
Scientists from Hubei